Geisa Aparecida Muniz Coutinho (born 1 June 1980) is a Brazilian track and field athlete who competes in the 400 metres sprint. She represented Brazil at the 2004 Summer Olympics and at the 2012 Summer Olympics and is a four-time participant in the World Championships in Athletics (2003, 2005, 2009, and 2011). Her personal best in the 400 m is 51.08 seconds, and she holds the South American record of 3:26.68 minutes for the 4×400 metres relay.

She was the South American champion in the 400 m in 2003, the silver medallist in 2005, and the bronze medallist in 2011. She has won three South American titles with the Brazilian relay team and a bronze at the Pan American Games. At the 2011 Military World Games, she was a triple gold medallist, having won the 400 m, 4×100 m relay, and 4×400 m relay events.

Career
Born in Araruama, she discovered athletics while at high school and tried the pole vault and sprinting events. She eventually focused solely on the 400 m and moved to Rio de Janeiro in order to train with the Vasco da Gama 16 sports club. She won her first Brazilian title in the 400 m in 2002 and took three consecutive victories at the annual event.

She made her world debut at the 2003 IAAF World Indoor Championships, running in the heats stage. Her first continental medals came at the 2003 South American Championships in Athletics, where she secured both the individual and relay 400 m titles for Brazil. She was also chosen for those events at the 2003 Pan American Games, and she helped Brazil to the bronze medal in the 4×400 metres relay. She made her outdoor global debut at the 2003 World Championships in Athletics, but was eliminated in the heats of the 400 m. In 2004, she won the bronze at the 2004 Ibero-American Championships and took a third Brazilian title. She was selected for the 400 m race and relay at the 2004 Athens Olympics but was eliminated in the first round of both events.

The following year she won the silver medal behind Maria Laura Almirão at the 2005 South American Championships in Athletics and joined her compatriot to win the relay gold. More relay success came at the 2005 World Championships in Athletics, as a team of Almirão, Coutinho, Josiane Tito and Lucimar Teodoro set a South American record time of 3:26.82 minutes in the heats, although they were disqualified in the final. She was a finalist in both the 200 metres and 400 m at the 2006 Ibero-American Championships, but she then disappeared from international competition with sub-par seasons in 2007 and 2008.

She joined the BM&F Bovespa sports club in 2009, coinciding with Coutinho's revival period. That year, she returned to international competition as she ran on the Brazilian relay team at the 2009 World Championships in Athletics. She won back-to-back 400 m national titles from 2010 to 2011. She also re-established herself at continental level, taking the 400 m bronze medal and relay gold at the 2011 South American Championships in Athletics. The 2011 Military World Games were held in her home state of Rio de Janeiro, and she provided one of the highlights for the hosts by winning the 400 m title in a personal best and Games record of 51.08 seconds. She won two further gold medals at the competition as she helped Brazil not only win the 4×400 m relay but also the 4×100 metres relay (in which she set another Games record). At the 2011 Brazilian championships, she ran a personal best of 23.07 seconds for the 200 m (later finishing third overall), won the 400 m race, and then set a South American record in the 4×400 m relay of 3:26.68 minutes with her club mates Bárbara de Oliveira, Joelma Sousa and Jailma de Lima.

Personal bests
100 m: 11.55 (wind: -0.2 m/s) –  São Paulo, 16 April 2011
200 m: 23.07 (wind: +0.7 m/s) –  São Paulo, 7 August 2011
400 m: 51.08 –  Rio de Janeiro, 22 July 2011

International competitions

References

External links

Tilastopaja biography

Living people
1980 births
Brazilian female sprinters
Olympic athletes of Brazil
Athletes (track and field) at the 2004 Summer Olympics
Athletes (track and field) at the 2012 Summer Olympics
Athletes (track and field) at the 2016 Summer Olympics
Athletes (track and field) at the 2003 Pan American Games
Athletes (track and field) at the 2011 Pan American Games
Sportspeople from Rio de Janeiro (state)
World Athletics Championships athletes for Brazil
Pan American Games silver medalists for Brazil
Pan American Games bronze medalists for Brazil
Pan American Games medalists in athletics (track and field)
Athletes (track and field) at the 2018 South American Games
South American Games gold medalists for Brazil
South American Games silver medalists for Brazil
South American Games medalists in athletics
Medalists at the 2003 Pan American Games
Medalists at the 2011 Pan American Games
Olympic female sprinters
20th-century Brazilian women
21st-century Brazilian women
People from Araruama